Hon'inbō Hakugen (本因坊伯元, 1726–1754) was a Japanese professional go player, and eighth head of the Hon'inbō house. He reached 6 dan level.

External links
 Page at Sensei's Library

1726 births
1754 deaths
Japanese Go players